William James Audsley (1833–1907) was an architect and a medical doctor of Scottish descent.

Life
William James Audsley was born in 1833 in Dufftown, Scotland. William James Audsley and his business partner (and brother) George Ashdown Audsley, first lived in Liverpool, running W. & G. Audsley – an architectural firm based in Liverpool, UK. William started living in New York City from 1892.

See also
W. & G. Audsley

References

1833 births
1907 deaths
People from Elgin, Moray
19th-century Scottish architects
British emigrants to the United States
Architects from Liverpool